Burnside High School is a state co-educational secondary school located in the suburb of Burnside in Christchurch, New Zealand. With a roll of  students, it is the largest school in New Zealand outside Auckland, and is among the country's four largest schools.

History
When the college considered moving away from its central city site, the Burnside property was considered, but the college purchased what is now known as the Ilam campus from the late 1940s instead. A reduced land area was used by the Ministry of Education for Burnside High School.

In April 1958, the Christchurch Post-primary Schools’ Council unanimously recommended Burnside High School be constructed and by a 7–2 margin recommended it as a single-sex girls' school. The lack of consultation, opposition from the community, and incorrect interpretation about demand for girls' secondary school places saw the council resind its decision to make Burnside a single-sex girls' school. On 24 June 1958, the council voted by a 6–4 margin to recommend Burnside be a coeducational school. 

Cabinet approved construction of the school in August 1958. Tenders for the first stage of construction were called, closing on 30 January 1959. Approval of a construction tender was delayed until late March 1959, losing three months of dry weather for construction and risking the completion in time for the 1960 school year. The tender for the first stage was let to John Calder Limited for £160,000, and construction began in mid-April 1959.

Burnside High School officially opened to students on 2 February 1960, with an initial intake of 230 third-form (now Year 9) students.

A swimming pool was added in 1961, which became fully functional in 1964 after the addition of filtration equipment. The gymnasium was soon constructed afterwards. In 2004 and 2005 construction of a new block, library and administration area began. These were opened in 2006 by Helen Clark, then Prime Minister of New Zealand. The school's fiftieth jubilee was held in 2010, attended by John Key, an ex-pupil and Prime Minister of New Zealand. Following damage caused by the February 2011 Christchurch earthquake, Avonside Girls' High School shared the facilities of Burnside High School. Avonside Girls' High School relocated back to their home site in 2012. Burnside High School, due to being relatively undamaged and with power and water restored shortly after the quake, was used as a welfare centre by Civil Defence.

On 28 March 2012 the school was put into lockdown after students reported seeing a man walking the grounds carrying a silver pistol, which was later found by police to be plastic.

Enrolment
Burnside, like many secondary schools in Christchurch, operates an enrolment scheme to help curb roll numbers and prevent overcrowding. The school's zone includes the suburbs of Burnside and Bryndwr, and parts of Bishopdale, Fendalton, Ilam and Avonhead.

At the August 2013 Education Review Office (ERO) review of the school, the school had 2416 students enrolled, including 135 international students. Forty-seven percent of students were male and 53 percent were female. Sixty-three percent of students identified as European (including 56 percent as New Zealand European or Pākehā), 22 percent as Asian, eight percent as Māori, two percent as Pacific Islanders, and five percent as another ethnicity.

Structure
The school is split into four divisions – North, South, West and Senior – the first three consisting of students from Years 9–12 and Senior division consisting of only Year 13 students. Each division has a guidance counsellor, three deans and a divisional principal and, in addition, Senior Division includes a careers advisor. The school has a Principal, Second Principal, Assistant Principal, 3 Divisional Principals, 12 deans and 13 Heads of Department.

Allan Hunter was principal from 1969 to 1980, when he retired. The current acting principal is Andrea Griffin, who took over the role after Phil Holstein's resignation.

Grounds and facilities

Like most New Zealand state secondary schools built in the 1960s, the school is largely built to the Nelson Two-Storey plan. The Nelson Two-Storey is distinguished by its two-storey H-shaped classroom blocks, with stairwells at each end of the block and a large ground floor toilet and cloak area on one side. Burnside has five of these blocks: A, B, D, E and F blocks.

The school has a school-broadcast system designed as an Armed Intruder Lockdown Scheme in the event of a Virginia Tech style school shooting , which informs teachers and students of an armed intruder, and safety measures to be taken to ensure classrooms and buildings are locked down for safety.

Academics
As a state school, Burnside High School follows the New Zealand Curriculum (NZC). In Years 11 to 13, students complete the National Certificate of Educational Achievement (NCEA), the main secondary school qualification in New Zealand. Cambridge Mathematics (IGCSE, AS, and A Levels) has been offered for Year 11 to 13 students since 2011.

Notable alumni

 Alex Behan (born 1979), music journalist and former RadioNZ presenter
 Eleanor Catton (born 1985), author and 2013 Man Booker Prize winner
 Julia Deans (born 1974), singer-songwriter
 Andrew Ellis (born 1984), All Black and member of the 2011 Rugby World Cup winning team
 Rob Fyfe (born 1961), former Chief Executive Officer of Air New Zealand
 Willi Heinz (born 1986), rugby union player for England
 Tearepa Kahi, film director
 John Key (born 1961), Prime Minister of New Zealand (2008–2016)
 Mikaele Ravalawa (born 1997), rugby league footballer
 Gareth Rowe (born 1977), All White (1997–2000)
 Henry Suluvale (born 1971), former professional rugby league footballer who represented Western Samoa
 Tom Taylor (born 1989), rugby union footballer
 Hayley Westenra (born 1987), Operatic pop singer
 Cal Wilson (born 1970), stand-up comedian and radio & television personality

Notes

References

External links

 Official website
Education Review Office (ERO) reports

Educational institutions established in 1960
Secondary schools in Christchurch
New Zealand secondary schools of Nelson plan construction
1960 establishments in New Zealand